Eduardo Feitoza Sampaio (born 14 December 1998), commonly known as Dudu, is a Brazilian footballer who plays as an attacking midfielder for Gloria Buzău.

Career statistics

Club

Notes

References

External links

1998 births
Living people
Brazilian footballers
Association football midfielders
Campeonato Brasileiro Série A players
CR Vasco da Gama players
Footballers from Rio de Janeiro (city)
Liga II players
FC Gloria Buzău players
Brazilian expatriate footballers
Brazilian expatriate sportspeople in Romania
Expatriate footballers in Romania